WJU may refer to:
Wheeling Jesuit University, a Roman Catholic university in Wheeling, West Virginia
William Jessup University, a non-denominational Christian college in Rocklin, California
Wonju Airport IATA code